La lettera B is a studio album by the Italians rappers Bassi Maestro and Babaman, released in 2009.

Track listing

Link 

2009 albums
Bassi Maestro albums